Stephen Lewis Secondary School is a public semestered high school in Vaughan, Ontario, Canada administered by the York Region District School Board. Currently, the school enrolls students in grades 9, 10, 11 and 12 all of which are from the 'Vaughan Block 10' region. The school is named for Canadian statesman Stephen Lewis.

The school opened for service on September 5, 2006, and was officially designated May 8, 2007.

Current Vice-Principals are: Antonietta Grieco and Elisa Shiffman.

Disciplines
Stephen Lewis Secondary School offers:
Alternative Education Quadmester Program
Arts (Dramatic Arts, Music, Visual Arts, Media Arts)
Business Studies
Canadian and World Studies (Economics, Law and Politics, Geography, History)
Community Based Education - Cooperative Education
Computer Studies
Dual Credit Program
English (Compulsory English courses begin with ENG, Elective courses)
English as a Second Language
French as a Second Language
Grade 12 - Semester 1 Only
Guidance and Career Education
Health and Physical Education
Interdisciplinary Studies
Mathematics
Science
Social Sciences and Humanities (Family Studies, General Social Science, Philosophy)
Special Education
Specialist High Skills Major (Business SHSM students only, Health and Wellness SHSM students only, Hospitality SHSM students only, Manufacturing SHSM students only)
Technological Education (An Introduction to Technology, Communication Technology, Computer Engineering Technology, Construction Technology, Hair and Aesthetics, Hospitality and Tourism, Manufacturing Technology, Technological Design, Transportation Technology)

Sports
Stephen Lewis Secondary School offers a number of sport programs to its students.

Fall
Co-ed cross-country running
Boys soccer
Varsity Boys Cricket
Boys Rugby Sevens

Winter
Boys basketball
Girls basketball
Girls volleyball
Varsity boys hockey
Co-ed Wrestling
Co-ed Swimming

Spring
Track and Field
Girls Flag Football
Boys Rugby Union
Co-ed Badminton
Girls Soccer
Varsity Ultimate Frisbee
Varsity Boys Baseball

Sport Awards

Stephen Lewis Secondary Schools offers three distinct Sport Awards. They have a Varsity Male Athlete of the Year award, a Varsity Female Athlete of the Year award, and a Triple Crown Fitness Award. Recent recipients of the Female Athlete of the Year Award include Nicole Kofsman in 2012 and Jillian Pereira in 2011. The inaugural winner of the Triple Crown Fitness Award was awarded to Sam Tenenbaum in 2012 and subsequently to Eldar Shaykhulislamov in 2014.

Charity activities

Stephen Lewis Secondary School holds fundraisers year-round for the Stephen Lewis Foundation, founded by Stephen Lewis.

Wake-A-Thon
Stephen Lewis Secondary holds an annual night event called 12 Hours for 12K Wake-A-Thon. During this event, students arrive at school in the evening and are expected to stay awake for 12 hours. To help, there are activities and games set up along the first floor of the school. These activities include, but are not limited to, dancing, airbrush tattoos, video games and movies. Dinner and desserts are provided by the chef, Mr. Walter. Pledge forms are given out and each student is required to raise at least $100. The money is given to the Stephen Lewis Foundation. This event has not been done during the COVID-19 pandemic.

Terry Fox Run
Stephen Lewis Secondary also raises money for cancer research yearly through the Terry Fox Run. Students collect pledges before the run, then they may walk, jog, or run around the soccer field.

Notable students 
Denis Shapovalov, tennis player, winner of 2016 Junior Wimbledon Singles Finals and 2015 US Open Junior Doubles Finals, career-high ATP singles ranking of No. 10 on September 21, 2020.

See also
List of high schools in Ontario

References

York Region District School Board
High schools in the Regional Municipality of York
2006 establishments in Ontario